Abubakar Bukola Saraki FC is a Nigerian association football club from Ilorin, Nigeria. They were promoted to the Nigeria Premier League at the end of the 2009–10 season. They played their debut season's home games in Offa and Bauchi while the Kwara State Stadium was being renovated.

They were put up for sale in July 2011 and bought by outgoing Kwara State governor Bukola Saraki for 250,000,000 naira, making them and JUTH F.C. the only Premier League teams that are not state-owned.

In 2011, the team was renamed from Bukola Babes to ABS (Abubakar Bukola Saraki) FC.

In 2016, the team returned to the Nigeria Professional Football League.

Notable players
 Alalade Wasiu
 Adeshina Gata
 Adeleye Tobi Joshua
 Abdulrahman Bashir
 Lordson Ichull
 Effiom Otu Bassey
 Etor Daniel
 Monday Samuel
 Thomas Zenke
 Abdullahi Oyedele
 Pascal Chimdindu Anorue

References

External links
Official website
Abubakar Bukola Saraki FC at Global Sports Archive

Football clubs in Nigeria
Kwara State
Association football clubs established in 2009
Sports clubs in Nigeria